Bezerk 2.0 is a 2006 album by Welsh glam metal band Tigertailz, released on Demolition Records. It is seen as a follow up to the original album Bezerk released on Music For Nations in 1990. It goes back to the more pop metal sound the band had at the time rather than the heavier sound they used on albums such as Banzai! and Wazbones. The album features similar artwork to the original Bezerk album.

Track listing 
 "Bezerk"(Instrumental) - 1:26
 "Do It Up" - 3:33
 "One Beat of Your Heart" - 4:05
 "I Believe" - 5:25
 "TVOD" - 3:30
 "Falling Down" - 3:49
 "Make Me Bleed" - 5:49
 "Get Real" - 3:22
 "Annie'z Gone" - 4:35
 "For Hate'z Sake" - 5:37
 "Sugar Fever" - 3:24
 "Dirty Needlez" - 4:13
 "Interview" (Bonus track)

References
Review: Bezerk 2.0, BBC Wales

2006 albums
Tigertailz albums